Blue Star Contemporary is a non-profit contemporary art institution located in San Antonio, Texas. It was established by a group of artists in 1986 after the success of the Blue Star Exhibition, a show featuring the work of local contemporary artists in the former Blue Star Ice and Cold Storage warehouse. Blue Star Contemporary is the longest-running non-profit contemporary art space in the city. Blue Star Contemporary, also known as BSC, is run by Executive Director Mary Heathcott. Open calls for artists from Texas, the United States, and abroad are held on an annual basis.

Background 
Blue Star Contemporary is housed in a renovated warehouse in the Blue Star Arts Complex, a mixed-use development containing lofts, apartments, galleries, artist studios, retail stores, and restaurants. The Blue Star Arts Complex is a stop on the VIA Metropolitan Transit VIVA Culture bus route. BSC is a part of the King Williams Cultural Arts District in the Southtown neighborhood and is located along the San Antonio River Walk.

Blue Star Contemporary is at the center of San Antonio's First Friday Art Walk, an event that takes place on the first Friday of each month and is intended to provide "a free showcase of the art community in San Antonio." Blue Star Contemporary is credited as being a revitalizing force for the arts district and surrounding neighborhoods. Contemporary Art Month (CAM), San Antonio's month-long celebration of local contemporary art in July, started at the museum.

Current programs

Current BSC programs include Creative Classrooms, a free six-week program that brings artists to school classrooms for weekly lessons, the MOSAIC Student Artist Program, a free after-school program for students interested in learning about the arts, and the Berlin Residency Program, a three-month residency at the Künstlerhaus Bethanien granted to four artists from Bexar County annually. Blue Star Contemporary partnered with BiblioTech, Bexar County's digital library, to open a reading room in the museum's Arts Education Lab in 2016.

Off-site art exhibitions

Art in the Garden is an ongoing partnership between Blue Star Contemporary and the San Antonio Botanical Garden. Each year, an artist is selected and commissioned to create a site-specific work in the garden.

Blue Star Contemporary has also partnered with the City of San Antonio's Department of Arts and Culture's Public Art San Antonio division (PASA) to commission Plexus c18 at the San Antonio International Airport. The work is described on the BSC website as "a site-specific public art installation by Dallas-based artist Gabriel Dawe. The installation, a weaving of approximately 90 miles of colored thread hooked from wall to ceiling that emulates the dynamic shape of an airplane, will suspend from the vaulted ceiling of the Terminal A ticketing Area. Plexus c18 is composed of more than 19 colors--creating a prism-like effect that represents the full spectrum of visible light. The art installation will be on view for three years beginning October 2016."

In addition to these off-site exhibitions and partnerships, BSC's MOSAIC student artists, under the direction of Artist-in-Residence Alex Rubio, have completed nine public works projects throughout the city, including murals and mosaics of handmade and hand-painted ceramic tiles.

References

External links
 Blue Star Contemporary
 https://web.archive.org/web/20070821000709/http://travel.nytimes.com/travel/guides/north-america/united-states/texas/san-antonio/attraction-detail.html?vid=1154654608603
 http://www.museumsusa.org/museums/info/1167675
 http://www.frommers.com/destinations/sanantonio/A7663.html
 http://www.bizjournals.com/sanantonio/stories/2008/05/05/story10.html
 http://www.americantowns.com/tx/sanantonio/organization/blue_star_contemporary_art_center
 http://www.tshaonline.org/handbook/online/articles/klblr
 http://findarticles.com/p/articles/mi_m1248/is_/ai_54432739

Contemporary art galleries in the United States
Museums in San Antonio
1985 establishments in Texas
Art museums established in 1985
Art museums and galleries in Texas